Modletice is a municipality and village in Prague-East District in the Central Bohemian Region of the Czech Republic. It has about 500 inhabitants.

Geography
It lies mostly in a flat landscape in the Prague Plateau. The southeastern part of the municipal territory extends into the Benešov Uplands.

History
The first written mention of Modletice is from 1336.

Economy
Modletice is known for its large industrial zone, which benefits from the proximity of Prague and the motorways. It mainly consists of logistics centres. The Czech branch of Billa, one of the largest employers in the country, has its headquarters in Modletice.

Transport
Modletice is located at the junction of the D0 and D1 motorways.

Sights
There are no significant monuments. The landmark of Modletice is the Modletice Castle. It is a Baroque castle from the 18th century, but lost its historical value due to insensitive reconstructions.

Gallery

References

External links

Villages in Prague-East District